HLCM can refer to:
Hannah Lindahl Children's Museum, a museum in Mishawaka, Indiana
High-Level Committee on Management, part of the United Nations System Chief Executives Board for Coordination
Holcim Philippines, a cement producer in the Philippines affiliated with Holcim
Hong Leong Company (Malaysia) Berhad, a subsidiary of Hong Leong Group